William E. Beck (November 8, 1832 – September 2, 1892) was an attorney and a delegate for the framing of the state's constitution. He was then a district court judge and jurist and chief justice of the Colorado Supreme Court.

Early life and education
Beck was born November 8, 1832 on a farm in Venango County, Pennsylvania. He was educated at district schools in Pennsylvania, two academies in Centre County, Pennsylvania, and then at the Classical and Commercial High School in Lawrenceville, New Jersey.

Career
After he completed his education, he was a schoolteacher for several years and he studied the law. He moved to LaSalle County, Illinois and established himself in Mendota where he published the newspaper, The Observer, with J.C. Crocker. He worked as a surveyor and engineer. He studied the law with Crocker 
and was admitted to the bar in Illinois on November 6, 1861. He practiced law in Mendota and Ottawa, Illinois. He married before he moved west.

In the fall of 1872, he settled in Boulder, Colorado and practiced law there until 1876. He was elected by members of the Republican party to participate in the framing of the state's constitution in 1875. He and Byron L. Carr represented the 4th District. Beck was the chairman of the Committee on Ways and Means. He was a member of the committees on judiciary department, right of suffrage, elections, and miscellaneous division. The constitution was passed by the Congress of the United States and approved on March 3, 1875. Beck was a Republican.

Beck operated a law firm with George D. Reynolds named Beck & Reynolds until November 6, 1876, because Beck had accepted a seat on the bench of the First Judicial District. He became an associate justice of the Colorado Supreme Court January 13, 1880. On January 9, 1883, he became the third Chief Justice of the Colorado Supreme Court, serving in this position until January 8, 1889. He was then appointed reporter of the decisions of the Supreme Court tribunal until his death.

Death
Beck died at his home in Denver on September 2, 1892. He was about 60 years old at the time of his death. He is buried in Riverside Cemetery in Denver.

Notes

References

Justices of the Colorado Supreme Court
Chief Justices of the Colorado Supreme Court
1842 births
1892 deaths
19th-century American judges